Buccochromis rhoadesii  is a species of haplochromine cichlid. It is endemic to Lake Malawi, Lake Malombe and the upper Shire River in the countries of Malawi, Mozambique, and Tanzania.

This is a piscivorous species which is found over softer substrates such as muddy or sandy areas as well as off beaches. The juveniles form large shoals.

The specific name honours Captain Edmund L. Rhoades, who commanded the British gunboat SS Gwendolen and who collected specimens of cichlids from Lake Malawi which he donated to the British Museum (Natural History).

References

rhoadesi
Fish described in 1908
Taxa named by George Albert Boulenger
Taxonomy articles created by Polbot